The 2000 Women's Professional Softball League season was the fourth season of professional women's fastpitch softball for the  league named Women's Professional Softball League (WPSL).  It was the WPSL's final season  until the league relaunched in 2004 under the name National Pro Fastpitch.  In 1997 and 1998, WPSL operated under the name Women's Pro Fastpitch (WPF).

Teams, cities and stadiums

Milestones and Events
In October 1999, the WPSL announced a restructuring plan to consolidate the league and to facilitate a tour between the league's teams and the USA Softball Women's National Team.  The plan was to take the  1999 roster of teams ( Akron Racers, Carolina Diamonds, Durham Dragons, Georgia Pride, Tampa Bay FireStix, and Virginia Roadsters) and reduce it to two teams in Ohio and two teams in Florida.  The tour of exhibition games against team USA was called "From Central Park to Sydney" (the 2000 Olympics were played in Sydney, Australia) and ran  from May to September.

The WPSL's two Florida teams were revealed as the Tampa Bay Firestix and  Florida Wahoos, and the Ohio  teams as the Akron Racers and Ohio Pride.  These locations in Florida and Ohio were intended to be developed as  national training centers for fastpitch softball.

On October 14, 1999 WPSL suspended operations of the Georgia Pride, Durham Dragons, Carolina Diamonds, and Virginia Roadsters. The contracted Roadsters' players were assigned to the newly created Ohio Pride of Akron, Ohio. The contracted Georgia Pride players were assigned to the expansion Florida Wahoos of Plant City, Fla. Tampa Bay FireStix relocated to Plant City Stadium in Plant City, Fla.  The players of the Dragons and Diamonds became available for selection in the 2000 WPSL draft.

Player Acquisition

Player Drafts

WPSL held Draft Day 2000 on December 4 at the Tradewinds Resort in St. Petersburg, FL during the National Fastpitch Coaches Association (NFCA) Convention.  Three drafts were held:
 The 2000 Elite/Supplemental Draft selected players from a pool of players on the rosters of the Dragons and Diamonds, 1999 USA Softball Olympic Trial and Olympic Festival invitees who had completed their collegiate eligibility, and WPSL players who were not on their teams' protected list.  The Florida Wahoos selected Fresno State shortstop Nina Lindenburg as the first elite/supplemental pick.
 The 2000 Senior Draft selected from collegiate senior fastpitch players.  The Ohio Pride chose Fresno State pitcher Amanda Scott as the first senior pick.
 The 2001 National Team Draft drew from the 2000 USA Olympic roster, with the hope the players selected would play in the WPSL in 2001. (However, the WPSL suspended play before the 2001 season.) The Akron Racers selected 1996 Olympic Gold Medal-winning pitcher Lisa Fernandez as the first overall National Team pick.

Central Park to Sydney tour

As part of the run-up to the 2000 Olympics in Sydney, a nine-city tour, called  “Central Park to Sydney Tour,” was scheduled between WPSL teams and the USA national softball team.   USA pitcher Lisa Fernandez pitched five straight perfect games, and in one of those games she struck out all 21 batters.

Tour schedule and results

League standings 
Source:

WPSL Championship
The 2000 WPSL Championship Series was held at Meador Park in Springfield, Mo on August 25 and 26.  The top two WPSL teams met in a best-of-three series to determine the champion.

Statistical Leaders
WOMEN'S PRO SOFTBALL LEAGUE LEADERS (THROUGH GAMES OF 8/19/00)

BATTING TOP 10 (MINIMUM  76 PLATE APPEARANCES)
 
HOME RUNS

RBI

STOLEN BASES

TEAM BATTING

TEAM PITCHING

PITCHING TOP 10 (MINIMUM  32 IP)

WINS

SAVES

STRIKEOUTS

Annual awards

Source:

WPSL All-Star Team

2000 WPSL All-Star Team roster

Head Coach: Cindy Bristow, Florida Wahoos

The USA Olympic softball team played a doubleheader against each NPF All-Star Team on July 13.  The Olympians swept the games beating the East 5-0, and edging the West 5-3 in 9 innings.
The West All-Stars beat the East by a score of 1-0 on July 14.  Nancy Evans was named the Most Valuable Player.

References

External links

See also

 List of professional sports leagues
 List of professional sports teams in the United States and Canada

Softball teams
Softball in the United States
Pro Softball League season
Soft